Hainich-Werratal (before October 2014: Mihla) is a Verwaltungsgemeinschaft in the district Wartburgkreis in Thuringia, Germany. The seat of the Verwaltungsgemeinschaft is in Amt Creuzburg.

The Verwaltungsgemeinschaft Hainich-Werratal consists of the following municipalities:

 Amt Creuzburg 
 Berka vor dem Hainich 
 Bischofroda 
 Frankenroda 
 Hallungen 
 Krauthausen
 Lauterbach 
 Nazza

References

Verwaltungsgemeinschaften in Thuringia